KHMV-LP is a low power radio station broadcasting out of Half Moon Bay, California.

History
KHMV-LP began broadcasting on February 14, 2014.

References

External links
 
 

Half Moon Bay, California
Radio stations established in 2015
HMV-LP
HMV-LP
2015 establishments in California